Barma is a surname. Notable people with the surname include:

Aarif Barma (born 1959), Hong Kong judge, and a Justice of Appeal of the Court of Appeal of Hong Kong
Catherine Barma (born 1945), French television producer
Claude Barma (1918–1992), French-Italian director and screenwriter, and an early creator of French television programmes
Ivan Barma, Russian architect, probably one of the architects and builders of Saint Basil's Cathedral on Red Square in Moscow (built between 1555 and 1560).
Lucie Barma, Canadian freestyle skier
Mustansir Barma, Indian scientist specializing in Statistical Physics
Panchanan Barma, Indian reformer
Pradip Kumar Barma, Indian politician
Haider Barma, former Hong Kong Secretary for Transport and Housing

See also 

 Barma (disambiguation)